Giuseppe Genco Russo (26 January 1893 – 18 March 1976) was an Italian mafioso, the boss of Mussomeli in the Province of Caltanissetta, Sicily.

Genco Russo, also known as "Zi Peppi Jencu", was an uncouth, sly, semi-literate thug with excellent political connections. A vulgar man – he used to spit on the floor no matter who was present – he was often photographed with bishops, bankers, civil servants and politicians. As such he was considered to be the arbiter of Mafia politics, and was regarded as the successor of Calogero Vizzini, who had died in 1954.

Although by then a wealthy landowner and politician (as a member of Democrazia Cristiana) he still kept his mule in the house and the toilet outside, which was little more than a hole in the ground with a stone for a seat and no walls or door, according to Mafia turncoat Tommaso Buscetta.

Traditional mafiosi, like Genco Russo and Calogero Vizzini, Mafia bosses in the years between the two world wars until the 1950s and 1960s, were the archetypes of the "man of honour" of a bygone age, as a social intermediary and a man standing for order and peace. Although they used violence to establish their position in the first phase of their careers, in the second stage they limited recourse to violence, turned to primarily legal sources of gain, and exercised their power in an open and legitimate fashion and became "[men] of order".

Early years

Genco Russo was born on 26 January 1893 in Mussomeli, Sicily, of very humble origin. His father was a simple peasant. At one time he was just a beggar, a fellow-villager said about him. In his youth he was forced to work as a goatherd on the large Polizzello estate owned by the noble Lanza Branciforti family. He started his criminal career as a juvenile highway robber, rustling cattle and sheep. Through a career of violence stretching from the 1920s to the 1940s, he established his position as a mafioso, a so-called "man of honour."

From 1918–1922 Genco Russo served in the military, leaving a record of "rebellious behaviour and impatience to discipline." In a 1927 report by the police chief of Caltanissetta, he was described as "a mafioso that acquired a respectable financial position out of nothing" and on the countryside people feared him. In 1929 he married with a local girl and four years later his first son Vincenzo was born. Best man at the baptism was fellow mafioso Calogero Vizzini who would also be the witness at the marriage of Vincenzo in 1950 together with Rosario Lanza, the president of the Sicilian regional assembly.

Until 1934 Genco Russo officially held no significant land holdings. As caretaker and lease-holder (gabelotto or bailiff) he controlled part of an estate and was an associate in a cooperative that controlled another. As associate of a cooperative of ex-combatants he also had a share in the Polizzello estate. He ruled the cooperative through intimidation and threats, while at the same time he kept working as labourer on the fields.

Arrests and acquittals
During Fascist rule, when the authorities embarked on a campaign against the Mafia, Genco Russo was arrested repeatedly on charges ranging from theft and extortion to membership in a criminal association, and 11 murders and several attempted murders, but with one exception, regularly acquitted on grounds of "insufficient evidence" (the mark of a successful mafioso showing his power to intimidate potential witnesses and enforce the law of silence – omertà).

Nevertheless, in 1929 the fascist prefect Cesare Mori arrested him with 331 other mafiosi during a massive raid. In 1928 he had been acquitted for lack of evidence by the prosecution of four murders, robberies and extortion and a year before, in 1927, he had been acquitted of criminal conspiracy. He was sentenced to seven years in prison for criminal association, later reduced to three years, and submitted to special surveillance between 1934–1938. In 1944 the court granted Genco Russo a decree of rehabilitation for his one conviction, thereby allowing him "to recreate a moral and social virginity, acquiring a respectability which will permit him to undertake even political activity."

From man of honour to man of order
From this time on, Genco Russo was to face no more criminal charges. Police files described him as a "man of order". Once established, the mafioso Genco Russo changed his original behaviour as "man of honour", to become a "man of order", inserting himself in public life and looking for a political position. His integration into the official power elite proceeded rapidly. After World War II, Genco Russo managed to control two large estates, one being the Polizzello estate where he once herded the goats. The princes of Lanza Branciforti di Trabia, made him gabelotto (bailiff) of the domain that measured 2,000 hectares or 20 km².

Both Genco Russo and Calogero Vizzini organized peasant cooperatives during both post-war periods, through which they deflected the appeal of the left-wing parties, maintained their hold over the peasants, and guaranteed their own continued access to the land. When land reform was finally enacted in 1950, mafiosi were in a position to perform their traditional role of brokerage between the peasants, the landlords, and the state. They exploited the intense land hunger of the peasants, gained concessions from the landlords in return for limiting the impact of the reform, and made substantial profits from their mediation in land sales. In the 1940s, Genco Russo and his followers controlled the rural savings bank, Cassa Rurale in Mussomeli leaving access to the money market partly in the hands of the Mafia.

A local peasant described to the social activist Danilo Dolci how Genco Russo's reputation changed: "He is constantly in contact with priests, priests go to his place, and he goes to the bank – which is always run by priests – the bank director is a priest, the bank has always been the priests' affair. Spending time with this sort of person has changed him, and now the police treat him with great respect, they greet him when they see him and go out of their way to show their regard for him. He wears better clothes today, and the marshal goes up to him and takes him by the hand, calls him Cavaliere ... during the election campaign, he went and had dinner with Zaccagnini, the Minister, and with Lanza, the Deputy – the three of them together – they had dinner and then they came out arm-in-arm."

Post-war activities

Persecution by the fascist authorities proved a blessing in disguise when the regime of Mussolini was toppled and Allied Military invaded Sicily in July 1943 (Operation Husky). The Allied Military Government of Occupied Territories (AMGOT) looking for anti-fascist notables to replace fascist authorities made Giuseppe Genco Russo mayor of his hometown Mussomeli. Coordinating the AMGOT effort was the former lieutenant governor of New York, Colonel Charles Poletti, whom Lucky Luciano once described as "one of our good friends."

Initially, his political activity was in support for the Separatist and Monarchist causes (he was awarded the honorific title of Cavaliere della Corona d'Italia in 1946), and ultimately for the Christian Democracy party. During the crucial 1948 elections that would decide on Italy's post-war future, Genco Russo and Calogero Vizzini sat at the same table with leading DC politicians, attending an electoral lunch. In 1950 when Genco Russo's oldest son married, Don Calò Vizzini was a witness at the ceremony, just as the Christian Democrat president of the Sicilian Regional Assembly, Rosario Lanza. He became a local Christian-democrat leader and town councillor in the 1960s. In 1962 he was forced to step down after he was denounced in the press.

Genco Russo's once described his role in the community to the social activist Danilo Dolci. It provides an illustration of the self-image of the mafioso in the second, "legitimate" stage of his career – the mafioso as a public benefactor rather than as a dangerous criminal: "It's in my nature. I have no ulterior motives. If I can do a man a favour, no matter who he is, I will; because that's how I'm made... I can't say 'no' to anyone. The trouble I'm put to is not so great that I have to refuse people in need... Very often warm-heartedness will win a man gratitude and friendship, and then the time comes to ask for one thing or another in... Folks come and ask how they should vote because they feel the need for advice. They want to show that they are grateful to those who have worked for their good; they want to thank them for what they've done by voting for them; but they are ignorant, and want to be told how to do it."

Heir of Vizzini

Giuseppe Genco Russo was considered to be the heir of Calogero Vizzini when Don Calò died in 1954. Genco Russo had been at the right-hand side of Don Calò's bier: the ancient sign that the heir-apparent was taking the place of the deceased. In the media both mafiosi were often depicted as the "boss of bosses" – although such a position does not exist in the loose structure of the Mafia. According to the pentito Antonio Calderone Genco Russo never had been the boss of Cosa Nostra of Sicily. The notoriety of Genco Russo was not looked upon well by other mafiosi. Like Vizzini, he exposed himself too much, giving interviews and getting photographed.

Genco Russo was present at a series of meetings between top American and Sicilian mafiosi that took place in Palermo between 12–16 October 1957, in Hotel Delle Palme in Palermo. Joseph Bonanno, Lucky Luciano and Carmine Galante were among the American mafiosi present, while among the Sicilian side there were – apart from Genco Russo – Salvatore "Ciaschiteddu" Greco, his cousin Salvatore Greco, also known as "l'ingegnere" or "Totò il lungo", Angelo La Barbera, Gaetano Badalamenti, Totò Minore and Tommaso Buscetta. One of the outcomes of this meeting was that the Sicilian Mafia composed its first Sicilian Mafia Commission and appointed "Ciaschiteddu" Greco as it's "primus interpares".

In the aftermath of the First Mafia War in 1962–63 and the Ciaculli Massacre that prompted the first concerted Antimafia efforts by the state in post-war Italy, Genco Russo was among the many mafiosi arrested (on 6 February 1964, when he turned himself in). He was often seen with DC deputy for Sicily, and the future Minister of Public Works, Antonino Pietro Gullotti, was photographed hand in hand with Genco Russo at the time when he was secretary for the DC in Sicily. All of which was duly recorded by the Antimafia Commission.

His appearance at the big Antimafia trials and the end of the 1960s made many of the island's establishment very nervous. When showing up in court, Genco Russo presented petitions from prominent politicians, priests, bankers, doctors, lawyers and businessman who declared to testify on his behalf. His lawyer threatened to publish telegrams from 37 Christian Democratic deputies – one a cabinet minister – thanking Genco Russo for helping them to get elected. Minister and prominent DC politician Bernardo Mattarella denied that he had been sent one. Genco Russo was sentenced to five years confinement by the Court of Caltanissetta, and sent to Lovere, near Bergamo.

Decline and death
His forced retirement as town councillor of Mussomeli, his arrest and years of confinement initiated the decline of Genco Russo's power. Within the Mafia a new generation of mafiosi was coming to the forefront. Genco Russo represented the old rural and semi-feudal Mafia that based their power on access to land openly acknowledged community power. The new generation was more entrepreneurial and made their money with cigarette smuggling, drug trafficking, skimming off public contracts and speculating in real estate.

Genco Russo never was the "boss of all bosses" as the media depicted him. He certainly had leverage providing voters for the DC at a local level, but it is hardly imaginable that the Mafia was ruled from a small and isolated town in the interior of Sicily, and not by the powerful Mafia families in Palermo. The fact that Salvatore Greco "Ciaschiteddu" – a representative of the Palermo based Mafia – was made 'secretary' of the first Sicilian Mafia Commission and not Genco Russo was a clear sign that his influence was limited. Genco Russo probably only was present at the Grand Hotel des Palmes Mafia meeting in 1957 because one of his relatives from the US, Santo Sorge, was there as well. Genco Russo apparently irritated other Mafia bosses because he was too much in the media spotlight. "Did you see Gina Lollobrigida in the newspaper today," a mafioso once said, referring to the notoriously ugly appearance of Genco Russo. The new generation of mafiosi did not share the style of openly exercised power. Instead they preferred to operate clandestinely and detested publicity.

In 1972 he returned to Mussomeli from his banishment. The journalist Giampaolo Pansa visited the old boss that year and described the decline in an article entitled The sunset of the mafia (in Italian: Il tramonto del mafioso) in which he depicted the old boss in rather squalid and degenerating circumstances after the death of his wife Rosalia. He did not answer the many questions and denied the existence of the Mafia: "Mafia? Mafia in Sicily? Out of the question! I have no knowledge, I do not know what to tell you."<ref name=sta> Il tramonto del mafioso], La Stampa, 23 September 1972</ref>

Giuseppe Genco Russo died peacefully at the age of 83 in March 1976 from a pulmonary emphysema. Half blind from cataracts and broken in health, he had spent the last four years living quietly in his son's home. At the time of his death, he possessed 147,000 hectares of land in several holdings around Casteltermini, Caltanissetta and Canicattì through front men and family members. The final testament of Giuseppe Genco Russo was written by the Antimafia Commission in its final report: "Genco Russo was really a typical example of a Sicilian mafia boss [...] a typical example of someone who particularly is able to assume and exercise to the community the function of commander, protector, mediator and adviser."

References

Sources
Arlacchi, Pino (1988). Mafia Business. The Mafia Ethic and the Spirit of Capitalism, Oxford: Oxford University Press 
 Arlacchi, Pino (1992). [https://books.google.com/books?id=uSXwAAAAIAAJ Gli uomini del disonore. La mafia siciliana nella vita del grande pentito Antonino Calderone, Milan: Mondadori  (Reprint Il Saggiatore, 2010)
Chubb, Judith (1989). The Mafia and Politics, Cornell Studies in International Affairs, Occasional Papers No. 23.
Dickie, John (2004). Cosa Nostra. A history of the Sicilian Mafia, London: Coronet 
Gambetta, Diego (1993).The Sicilian Mafia: The Business of Private Protection, London: Harvard University Press, 
Hess, Henner (1998). Mafia & Mafiosi: Origin, Power, and Myth, London: Hurst & Co Publishers,  (Review)
 Mangano, Antonello (2000). Mafia come sistema, terrelibre.it
Paoli, Letizia (2003). Mafia Brotherhoods: Organized Crime, Italian Style, New York: Oxford University Press 
Servadio, Gaia (1976). Mafioso. A history of the Mafia from its origins to the present day, London: Secker & Warburg 
Sterling, Claire (1990). Octopus. How the long reach of the Sicilian Mafia controls the global narcotics trade'', New York: Simon & Schuster,

External links

Excerpt from The Honoured Society by Norman Lewis.

1893 births
1976 deaths
People from Mussomeli
Christian Democracy (Italy) politicians
20th-century Italian politicians
Sicilian mafiosi
Gangsters from the Province of Caltanissetta